= Syracuse Arms Company =

Syracuse Arms Company was a firearms manufacturing company located in Syracuse, New York that produced firearms between 1888 and 1908. They are best known for their shotguns.

== History ==
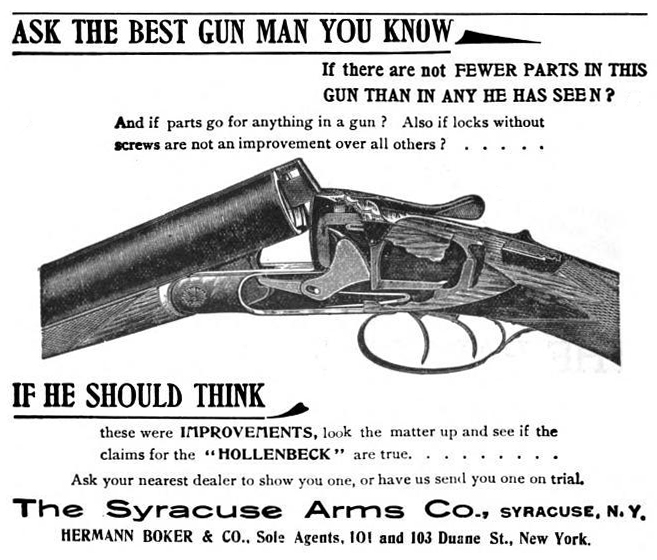
Syracuse Arms Company - Advertisement - 1896

The Syracuse Arms Company advertised the Hollenbeck shotgun in 1896 that had "fewer parts in this gun than any gun seen." The broker was Hermann Boker & Company of 101 Dusne Street in New York City.

The Syracuse Arms Company was incorporated in 1893 and commenced production of a double barrel shotgun named "The Hollenbeck" after its inventor Frank A. Hollenbeck. Frank Hollenbeck resigned from the Syracuse Arms Company in July, 1895; and in 1896, the gun was renamed "The Syracuse" which name remained unchanged from that point through the end of production. The Syracuse Arms company only manufactured double shotguns; and only hammerless shotguns until late 1904. Syracuse Arms Company produced hammerless model double guns in a variety of grades as follows: Grade 00, Grade 0, Grade 1, Grade 2, Grade 3, Grade A, Grade A-1 Special Trap, Grade B, Grade C, and Grade D; with the Grade D gun being their highest grade and retailing at $475.00 in 1904. Hammerless model Syracuse guns were produced in 10, 12, 16 (in 1901), and 20 (in 1902) gauges. The hammer model Syracuse gun was only offered in one grade and one gauge (12-bore) with a retail of $24.00. The Syracuse Arms Company was sold to Simmons Hardware Company of St. Louis, MO in April 1905; and although some additional guns were produced afterwards and sold through the sporting goods department of Simmons Hardware, no advertising materials promoting the Syracuse Gun have been located after April, 1905. Syracuse hammerless guns begin at serial number 1 and have been observed into the 39XXX serial number range. Some Syracuse hammerless guns were sold under a "Trade Name" called "New Era", which name was also placed on some hammerless double guns produced by the Baker Gun Company, which is often a source of confusion; but all Syracuse "Trade Name" guns will fall within the above noted 1-39XXX serial number range. Syracuse hammer guns were assigned a separate serial number sequence containing a letter prefix beginning at "H1" and continuing numerically up through perhaps H2XXX. The Syracuse hammer gun was the only Syracuse model never cataloged; although the 1904 Syracuse pocket catalog does contain a folding insert devoted solely to the Syracuse hammer gun.
